Psychedelic Porn Crumpets is an Australian psychedelic rock band formed in 2014 in Perth. The band are made up of English guitarist and singer Jack McEwan, guitarist Luke Parish, drummer Danny Caddy, bassist Wayan Billondana, and keyboardist Chris Young, who began playing together in "an old horse barn in Leederville". Their genre and sound has been compared to that of other popular psychedelic rock bands in Australia, such as King Gizzard & the Lizard Wizard and Tame Impala. They have self-described their sound as "an energetic mess of colour and tone". Concerning the reasoning behind the name of the band, its members have given little explanation. The band claims it was chosen at random because they thought it was amusing.

Band history 
The bandmates were friends prior to the creation of the band. It has been suggested that they became acquainted through their mutual drug dealer. The band began initially as a university project for a unit that Jack McEwan was taking at the time. They then continued to make music for their own enjoyment, as well as for that of their young local community in what has been described as “garage rave” type settings. They have made a point of retaining a ‘DIY’ band mantra, recording most of their own songs, as well as aiming to be very hands-on in their own advertisement.

The band went on in 2017 to create their own record label, What Reality? Records. They have made clear that they chose to do this for reasons of "getting stuck into existence, taking a risk, pursuing ideas, setting goals and trying to dream big." The first release on this new label was a twin reissue of both parts of their High Visceral albums. One year after the release of their label, though, the band still had not signed any other musicians due to financial reasons, despite the fact that they still held an ideal vision for What Reality? Records as "a support structure for upcoming bands".

In 2018 came the release of their single, "Social Candy", which was overall well received and led to a brief national tour through October of the same year, passing through Melbourne, Adelaide, and Perth. This tour was when the band first introduced the back-up drummer Peter Coyne.

In May 2019, the band played in the UK at the All Points East music festival, at the Victoria Park event. In July 2019, following the release of their album, And Now for the Whatchamacallit, they embarked on a national tour passing through Adelaide, Brisbane, Melbourne, Sydney, as their hometown of Perth.

In October 2019, the band released "Mundungus", which was described by Music Fest News as "beautifully chaotic and explosive".

On 5 August 2020, the band released the single "Mr Prism".

On 5 February 2021, the band released the album Shyga! The Sunlight Mound.

On 15 October 2021, they released their first single for their upcoming album Night Gnomes. The single is called "Lava Lamp Pisco".

On 22 April 2022, their album, Night Gnomes, was released.

Musical influences 
The band has been cited saying that some of the inspiration for their music comes in part from classic rock of the 1960s and 1970s, such as Led Zeppelin, Black Sabbath, and the Beatles. However, they have been influenced by more than just the rock genre, getting inspiration also from experimental electronic jazz. Jack McEwan, the band's vocalist, has also mentioned that their style "is pretty much identical" to that of Pond and Tame Impala, bands that are often viewed to be in the same sphere. McEwan has also stated that he believes Australia, and his hometown of Perth in specific to be a hotspot for rock music, and attributes the growth of the band partially to the live music scene in the city. Besides the Porn Crumpets, King Gizzard and the Lizard Wizard and Tame Impala, two of the band's influences, also hail from Australia. Some have give credit to King Gizzard and Tame Impala for creating the current Australian psychedelic rock scene. Many consider psychedelic rock to be Australia's main musical export in modern times, also citing the bands such as Pond, Orb, Gum and more as evidence for this claim.

The band is also commended on their music videos, which follow the same trance-like genre as their music, and have quoted a myriad of influences in this sphere such as Monty Python, TED Talks, and Woody Allen. As for the inspiration for the name of the band, Jack McEwan has quoted Mighty Boosh as a partial influence.

Members 
Jack McEwan
Jack McEwan is the band's vocalist, main songwriter and the member credited with being the main pioneer behind the band. He was born in 1993 Upon the release of the band's own record label, What Reality? Records, Jack told press that its creation was "only a matter of time".

Jack grew up in England, where his passion for music was kindled both by his father and through playing in bands from the age of nine onwards. His family migrated to Australia when he was thirteen. He also has a degree in graphic design, which he uses in creating the band's artwork.

Luke Parish
Luke Parish is the lead guitarist for the band. He has been quoted stating that his biggest influence on the guitar is David Gilmour of Pink Floyd.

Danny Caddy
Danny Caddy is the band's drummer. He and Jack McEwan played in a band prior to the formation of the Psychedelic Porn Crumpets.

Luke Reynolds
Luke Reynolds was the band's bass player.

Chris Young
Chris Young plays the guitar/keyboard for the band in the songs that require the instrument.

Peter Coyne
Peter Coyne is the band's back-up drummer. He used to be lead but after a wrist injury during his NRL season with the St. George Illawarra Dragons, he was placed into back-up.

Wayan Billondana replaced Luke Reynolds on bass.
Jamie Reynolds
During the 2022 tour, Jamie Reynolds temporarily filled in as bass player.

 Rodney the Turtle
During the 2022 tour, Rodney the Turtle did backing vocals for the band.

Discography

Studio albums

Extended plays

Awards and nominations

ARIA Music Awards
The ARIA Music Awards is an annual ceremony presented by Australian Recording Industry Association (ARIA), which recognise excellence, innovation, and achievement across all genres of the music of Australia. They commenced in 1987.

! 
|-
| 2021|| Shyga! The Sunlight Mound || ARIA Award for Best Hard Rock or Heavy Metal Album || 
| 
|-

National Live Music Awards
The National Live Music Awards (NLMAs) are a broad recognition of Australia's diverse live industry, celebrating the success of the Australian live scene. The awards commenced in 2016.

|-
| National Live Music Awards of 2019
| Psychedelic Porn Crumpets
| Live Act of the Year
| 
|-

West Australian Music Industry Awards
The West Australian Music Industry Awards (WAMIs) are annual awards presented to the local contemporary music industry, put on annually by the Western Australian Music Industry Association Inc (WAM). Psychedelic Porn Crumpets have won three awards.
 
 (wins only)
|-
| rowspan="2"| 2018
| Psychedelic Porn Crumpets
| Most Popular Live Act 
| 
|-
| "Social Candy" (Psychedelic Porn Crumpets)
| Best Music Video 
| 
|-
| 2020
| "Mr Prism" (Psychedelic Porn Crumpets)
| Best Music Video 
| 
|-

References

Further reading

2014 establishments in Australia
Musical groups established in 2014
Musical groups from Perth, Western Australia
Australian progressive rock groups
Australian psychedelic rock music groups